Dihydro-resveratrol is a dihydrostilbenoid found in wine. It is also a metabolite of trans-resveratrol formed in the intestine by the hydrogenation of the double bond by microflora. It is also a non-cannabinoid estrogenic compound found in cannabis.

References

External links

Dihydrostilbenoids